Claude Augé (31 October 1854 – 22 July 1924) was a French pedagogue, publisher, and lexicographer.

Biography 
First a school master, he married a grand niece of Pierre Larousse's wife, joined the Librairie Larousse as bookkeeper in 1885 and became quickly one of the directors. Until his death, he continued to pursue the work of the famous lexicographer.

In 1920, while continuing his work, he chose to be replaced in his editorial functions, by his son Paul Augé.

Personal works 
From 1891 to 1895: Cours d'histoire de France (levels: first grade, elementary and middle course), in collaboration with Maxime Petit. Works that have been republished many times until 1923.
From 1890 to 1912 : Cours de grammaire in 4 volumes (from preparatory courses to higher education): this brilliant collection trained generations of French people (certificat d'étude;brevet élémentaire ; brevet supérieur) until the eve of World War II.
 Around 1895: Le Livre de Musique. Many reprints until 1954.
 1899: Boky fiomanana amin' ny tantaran' i Frantsa nation'i Claude Augé sy Maxime Petit, nadikan-d Razafimahefa ho teny malagasy... - Livre préparatoire d'histoire de France... translated into Malagasy by Razafimahefa... Paris : Larousse, (1899)
 1905: le Cabinet de l'instituteur

Editorship 
1889: Dictionnaire complet illustré en 1 volume.
1897-1904 : Nouveau Larousse illustré, in seven large volumes (plus 1 supplement in 1907) ("light" and completely redesigned successor of the Grand Dictionnaire Universel du XIXe by Pierre Larousse in fifteen volumes and two supplements. The Nouveau Larousse Illustré aimed at objectivity and scientific precision, absent in its predecessor (rigor in definitions, selection of relevant examples and especially introducing a rich high quality iconography for the time). This dictionary, which was a true publishing success, led the way by his encyclopedic design to contemporary dictionaries.)
1905: Petit Larousse illustré (successor of the Dictionnaire complet illustré) (It summarized in one volume what the Nouveau Larousse Illustré in 7 large volumes developed with extraordinary richness.)
1907 and 1908 : Larousse pour tous (2 volumes)
1910: Larousse classique illustré (New encyclopedic dictionary in one volume of more than 1100 pages with 4150 prints - 70 tables - 114 cards for "A dictionary without examples is a skeleton." It would give rise to numerous editions: for example eightieth edition in 1939 ...)
1922: Larousse universel (successor of the Larousse pour tous) (represented the family Larousse par excellence. Indeed, its 2-volume offered more developed information than the Petit Larousse while remaining accessible by its price, to a majority of families.)
1924: Nouveau Petit Larousse illustré.

Periodical publication 
1907-1957 : Larousse mensuel illustré

Trivia 

Claude Augé's hôtel particulier, located on the place de l'Hôtel de Ville, was registered as Monument historique 10 February 1992. The building has been listed for its Art Nouveau stained glass, the most famous of which was inspired by the sower of Eugène Grasset (1845-1917), who served as monogram for the Librairie Larousse from 1890 to 1937 and modernized in 1954. It gave way in 1960 to a creation of Jean Picart Le Doux, which disappeared of the jacket in 1967 to return in 1999.

External links 
 
 CLAUDE AUGE, le père gersois du « Petit Larousse »

Publishers (people) from Paris
French lexicographers
French encyclopedists
1854 births
People from Gers
1924 deaths